Tynset is a municipality in Innlandet county, Norway.

Tynset may also refer to:

Tynset (novel), a lyrical work of prose published in 1965 by the German writer Wolfgang Hildesheimer. 
Tynset (village), a village in Tynset municipality in Innlandet county, Norway
Tynset Church, a church in Tynset municipality in Innlandet county, Norway
Tynset IF, a Norwegian sports club from Tynset municipality in Innlandet county, Norway